Villequier-Aumont is a commune in the Aisne department in Hauts-de-France in northern France.

Villequier-Aumont was formerly called Genlis, and was the seat of a marquisate.

Population

See also
Communes of the Aisne department

References

Communes of Aisne
Aisne communes articles needing translation from French Wikipedia